4'-O-glucoside may refer to:

 Hydrangenol 4'-O-glucoside, an isocoumarin glucoside
 Okanin 4'-O-glucoside or marein, a chalconoid glucoside
 Quercetin 4'-O-glucoside or spiraeoside, a flavonol glucoside

See also
 O-glucoside